Eupromus nigrovittatus is a species of beetle in the family Cerambycidae. It was described by Maurice Pic in 1930. It is known from Vietnam and China. It feeds on Cinnamomum camphora and Tectona grandis.

References

Lamiini
Beetles described in 1930